Bayatan (also Romanized as Bayātān, Bayātūn, and Beyātūn) is a village in Chalanchulan Rural District, Silakhor District, Dorud County, Lorestan Province, Iran. At the 2006 census, its population was 801, in 188 families.

References 

Towns and villages in Dorud County